The 2022 Chinese Figure Skating Championships, originally scheduled to 25–31 December 2022, was held from 11-13 January 2023 in Chengde Ice Sports Centre in Chengde, Hebei. This was the first major national figure skating championships to be held in-person due to the COVID-19 pandemic in Chinese mainland since 2020. Medals were awarded in the disciplines of men's singles, ladies' singles, pair skating, and ice dance at the senior level.

Schedule

Entries
The entry list is listed as follow

Summary
 Most of the skaters were infected with covid and impacted by post-covid syndromes. As a result, oxygen tanks are provided for skaters in the kiss and cry area. While no figure skating clubs from Jilin, a traditionally strong province in winter sports, send entries to the championships as most of the skaters are either infected with covid, or are recovering from the virus after participating in the 3rd Chinese-Russian Winter Youth Games.
 As Peng Zhiming failed to gain approval from his previous figure skating club to switch to a new club, he is unable to compete in the competition by using the name of any club leagues, but was given a test quota by the Chinese Figure Skating Association. Although he could compete in the games, the score will not be taken into record.
 Wang Zhifei withdrew from men's singles due to post-covid syndrome.

Medalists

Results

Men's singles

Women's singles

Pairs skating

Ice dancing

Records
 Sun Youmei / Li Ze'en successfully did a quadruple twist in the free skate, becoming the only pair to complete such high-level difficult jump in the 2022-23 Chinese national championships.

References

Chinese Figure Skating Championships
2022 in figure skating
Chinese Figure Skating Championships, 2022
Sport in Hebei